Abdul Latif Mia is a Bangladesh Awami League politician and the former Member of Parliament of Dinajpur-10.

Career
Mia was elected to parliament from Dinajpur-10 as a Bangladesh Awami League candidate in 1973.

References

Awami League politicians
Living people
1st Jatiya Sangsad members
Year of birth missing (living people)